Francesco Vassallo (born 30 December 1993) is an Italian footballer who plays as a midfielder for Monopoli.

Biography
Vassallo started his career at Palermo. In June 2012 Vassallo graduated from the reserve team and left for the fourth tier club Foligno in co-ownership deals along with Andrea Adamo for a peppercorn of €500 each. Vassallo made his professional debut in Italian Lega Pro cup. On 31 August 2012 Adamo was sold outright for €14,667 in exchange with the 50% rights of Vassallo for €500. However Vassallo also returned to Foligno in a temporary deal for €1,000 with a new pre-set price. Palermo also subsidized Foligno €14,667 as performance bonus. Thus, Foligno got Adamo for a peppercorn of €1,000 net as a rewards to sell first team place to inexperienced Vassallo.

On 11 July 2013 he moved on loan to the third tier club South Tyrol, located in the autonomous province of the same name. Vassallo was the starting midfielder in the cup as well as in the league, despite he was a sub for Branca in the first round.

On 9 July 2014 he was signed by Pistoiese.

On 31 August 2016 he was sold to fellow Lega Pro club Siena in a 2-year contract.

On 29 September 2020 he signed a two-year contract with Monopoli.

International career 
Vassallo had played for the Italy U19 and Italy U20 youth selections.

References

External links
 FIGC 
 AIC profile 

1993 births
Footballers from Palermo
Living people
Italian footballers
Italy youth international footballers
Association football midfielders
Palermo F.C. players
A.S.D. Città di Foligno 1928 players
F.C. Südtirol players
U.S. Pistoiese 1921 players
A.C.N. Siena 1904 players
S.S. Monopoli 1966 players
Serie C players